The Welsh Affairs Select Committee (or simply the 'Welsh Affairs Committee') is a select committee of the House of Commons in the Parliament of the United Kingdom. The remit of the committee is to examine the expenditure, administration and policy of the Wales Office, as well as relations with the Senedd. The members of the committee are usually Welsh MPs.

Current membership
As of July 2022, the membership of the committee is as follows:

Changes since 2019

Membership 2017–2019
The election of the chair took place on 12 July 2017, with the members of the committee being announced on 11 September 2017.

Changes 2017-2019

Membership 2015–2017
The chair was elected on 18 June 2015, with members being announced on 13 July 2015.

Changes 2015-2017

Membership 2010–2015
At the dissolution of the 2010–2015 Parliament, the committee's membership was:

2010–2015 changes
Occasionally, the House of Commons orders changes to be made in terms of membership of select committees, as proposed by the Committee of Selection. Such changes are shown below.

Membership 2005–2010

At the start of the 2005–2010 Parliament, the committee's membership was:

2005–2010 changes
Changes between 2005 and 2010 are not known.

List of chairs 

 Office officially vacant from 30 March 2015 to 18 June 2015 and from 3 May 2017 to 7 July 2017.

See also
Parliamentary Committees of the United Kingdom

References

External links 
Records of the Welsh Affairs Committee are held at the Parliamentary Archives
UK Parliament: Welsh Select Committee

Select Committees of the British House of Commons
Politics of Wales